Children of the Soil: A Story of Scandinavia is a children's novel by Nora Burglon, published by Doubleday, Doran & Co. in 1932 with illustrations by Edgar Parin D'Aulaire. Set in Sweden in the early 1900s, it tells the story of a poor family whose ability and hard work brings them success. Burglon was a runner-up for the 1933 Newbery Medal recognizing the "most distinguished contribution to American literature for children".

References

External links
 Nora Burglon at Library of Congress Authorities 
 With links to 5 catalog records and 5 more "from old catalog".
 Nora Burglon at WorldCat
 Nora Burglon at WorldCat, second listing
 Records for Nora Burglon have not been integrated by libraries. Listings may or may not cover multiple people named Nora Burglon.

1932 American novels
American children's novels
Newbery Honor-winning works
Novels set in Sweden
Novels set in the 1900s
Doubleday, Doran books
1932 children's books